The 1982 RTHK Top 10 Gold Songs Awards was held in 1982 for the 1981 music season.

Top 10 song awards
The top 10 songs (十大中文金曲) of 1982 are as follows.

Other awards

References
 RTHK top 10 gold song awards 1982

RTHK Top 10 Gold Songs Awards
Rthk Top 10 Gold Songs Awards, 1982
Rthk Top 10 Gold Songs Awards, 1982